Greig is the name of a noble family of Scottish origin. They are a branch of Clan Gregor, that changed their name due to the proscription of the name MacGregor in 1603 by King James VI & I.

Notable members 
 Samuel Greig, (1735, Inverkeithing, Fife, Scotland - 26 October 1788, Tallinn, Estonia, Russian Empire) was a Scottish-born Russian admiral who distinguished himself in the Battle of Chesma (1770) and the Battle of Hogland (1788). In 1782 he was elected a Fellow of the Royal Society
Aleksey Samuilovich Greig (Russian: Алексей Самуилович Грейг) (6 September 1775 – 18 January 1845) was an admiral of the Imperial Russian Navy, was the son of Admiral Samuel Greig, brother-in-law of Mary Somerville.
Alexey (5 September 1829—11 March 1865)
Samuil Alexseevich Greig (1827 — 1887) was a full general and adjutant general of Imperial Russian Army, also he served as State Comptroller (1874–1878) and Minister of Finance of the Russian Empire (1878 - 1880).
Julia (5 September 1829—11 March 1865)
Ivan (6 March 1831—15 September 1893)
Vasili (10 March 1832—1902)
Sarra (1833—1834)
Eugenie (15 February1835—16 February 1870).

Honours
In 1864, Greigia is a genus of the botanical family Bromeliaceae is named after Samuel Greig, by Eduard August von Regel (a director of the St Petersburg Botanical Garden).
Then in 1873, Regel named a species of Tulip after Samuel Greig, Tulipa greigii. Due to Greig once being president of the Russian Horticultural Society.

Atoll in French Polynesia Niau named Greig after Aleksey Greig by Russian Admiral Fabian Gottlieb von Bellingshausen in 1820.

References

 

Russian noble families
Russian families of Scottish origin